
Gmina Łękawica is a rural gmina (administrative district) in Żywiec County, Silesian Voivodeship, in southern Poland.

Villages
Gmina Łękawica contains the villages and settlements of Kocierz Moszczanicki, Kocierz Rychwałdzki, Łękawica, Łysina and Okrajnik.

Neighbouring gminas
Gmina Łękawica is bordered by the town of Żywiec and by the gminas of Andrychów, Czernichów, Gilowice, Porąbka and Ślemień.

References

Lekawica
Żywiec County